The Ventura County Arts Council is the official arts council for Ventura County, located in Southern California.

It was founded in 1996, and incorporated as a 501(c)(3) public-benefit corporation in 1997.

Function
The Ventura County Arts Council is the official local partner of the California Arts Council. It has strategic partnerships with the California Department of Education, the Ventura County Superintendent of Schools, and the Ventura County Board of Supervisors.

See also

External links
 

Arts councils of California
Arts Council
Art in Greater Los Angeles
Education in Ventura County, California
501(c)(3) organizations
Organizations established in 1996
1996 establishments in California